The 1781 English cricket season was the 10th in which matches have been awarded retrospective first-class cricket status. The scorecards of six first-class matches have survived. Broadhalfpenny Down in Hampshire was abandoned in favour of Windmill Down and the earliest known mention of cricket in Lancashire has been found during the season.

Matches 
Six first-class match scorecards survive from 1781, all of them featuring sides from Kent.

Other events
Broadhalfpenny Down, which had been used by the Hambledon Club as their home venue, was used for the last time by the club as a home venue in first-class cricket.

A match on Brinnington Moor in August is the earliest known reference about cricket being played in Lancashire.  It was reported in the Manchester Journal on 1 September.

First mentions

Players
 Hogben (Kent)
 J. Martin (Essex)
 Webb (Kent)

References

Further reading
 
 
 
 
 

1781 in English cricket
English cricket seasons in the 18th century